Inspiration: A Tribute to Nat King Cole is a studio album by George Benson. The album was released by Concord Jazz on June 4, 2013.  It peaked at #89 on the Billboard album chart.

Critical reception

Inspiration: A Tribute to Nat King Cole has received very positive reception from music critics. Steve Leggett of Allmusic affirmed that "it all adds up to a sweet and very impressive album, full of warmth and heart, and it swings where it should." At USA Today, Steve Jones praised it for "his smooth vocals [that] make this homage unforgettable."

Formats 
 Vinyl LP
 Regular CD
 Best Buy Edition CD (incl. 2 Bonus Tracks)
 Japanese Edition CD (incl. Bonus Track)
 QVC Edition (Regular CD + 6-track Bonus Disc)
 HD Tracks (High Definition Music Downloads)
 iTunes (incl. Bonus Track)

Track listing

Personnel 
 George Benson – vocals, guitar
 Lil' Georgie Benson (age 8) – vocals (1), ukulele (1)
 Tim May – guitar
 Mike O'Neill – baritone guitar (15), banjo (15)
 Randy Waldman – acoustic piano, conductor,  arrangements (2, 3, 6, 9, 10, 14, 15), string arrangements (4), backing vocals (10)
 Chuck Berghofer – bass
 Gregg Field – drums
 Michael Fisher – percussion
 Sheila E. – percussion (3)
 Wynton Marsalis – trumpet (3)
 Till Brönner – trumpet (9)
 Nelson Riddle – original arrangements (2, 7, 8, 11, 12, 13), horn arrangements (4)
 Idina Menzel – vocals (5)
 Alvin Chea – backing vocals (9, 10, 14, 15)
 Janey Clewer – backing vocals (9, 10, 14, 15)
 Don Shelton – backing vocals (9, 10)
 Chris Papastephanou – backing vocals (10)
 Judith Hill – vocals (11)

Henry Mancini Institute Orchestra
 Shelton Berg – dean of music 
 Terence Blanchard – artistic director 
 Scott Flavin – artistic coordinator 
 Stephen Guerra – managing director 

Brass and Woodwinds
 Cassandra Eisenreich – flute
 Neil Carson and Kevin McKeown – alto saxophone 
 Derek Smith – baritone saxophone
 Mark Small and Alex Weitz – tenor saxophone 
 Major Bailey, Chris Gagne, Kendall Moore and Stephen Szabadi – trombone 
 Chris Burbank, Ryan Chapman, Jared Hall and Gilbert Paz – trumpet 
 Jon Anderson – French horn

Strings
 Steffen Zeichner – concertmaster and violin soloist 
 Rachel Hershey, Jeff Kipperman and Yen-Ling Lin – bass
 Joy Adams, Sarah Gongaware, Cecilia Huerta, Andrew Kromholz and  Chia-Li Yu – cello
 Christina Hardister – harp
 Marcela Fernandez, Lauren Miller, Robyn Savitzky and Kathryn Severing – viola 
 Victor Colmenares, Tomas Cotik, Adam Diderrich, Michelle Godbee, Patricia Jancova, Michelle Mlacker, Karin O'Keefe, Jonah Osawa, Rob Patrignani, Zack Piper, James Reynolds, Katrina Schaeffer, Arianne Urban, Abby Young and Steffen Zeichner – violin

Production 
 Producers – John Burk and Randy Waldman 
 Recording and Mix Engineers – Seth Presant and Al Schmitt
 Assistant Engineers – Chad Jolly, Chris Owens and Shinnosuke Miyazawa.
 Recorded at The Village Studios (Los Angeles, California).
 Orchestra recorded by Dave Polar at The Hit Factory Criteria (Miami, Florida).
 Trumpet on Track 3 recorded by Jeff Jones 
 Additional piano recording by Randy Waldman at Randini Studio (Studio City, California).
 Mastered by Paul Blakemore at CMG Mastering (Cleveland, Ohio).
 Music Preparation – Brian Benison and Junko Tamura
 A&R Administration – Mary Hogan 
 Creative Director – Larissa Collins 
 Art Direction, Design and Photography – Greg Allan at Omnivore Creative.
 Management – Stephanie Gonzalez at Apropos Management.

Release history

References 

George Benson albums
2013 albums
Albums arranged by Nelson Riddle
Concord Records albums
Nat King Cole tribute albums